Areni Stadium is a multi-purpose stadium in Suceava, the largest municipality and county seat town of Suceava County. It currently is the home ground of Foresta Suceava. The stadium had a total capacity of 12,500 seats and was opened in 1963 as the Municipal Stadium. Additionally, the stadium was also renovated between the periods 1976–1977, 1980–1982, and 2002 respectively. After the seats were installed it holds 7,000 people.

Gallery

See also
 Foresta Suceava
 List of football stadiums in Romania

References

Football venues in Romania
Buildings and structures in Suceava
Multi-purpose stadiums in Romania